Samrath Lal Meena is the Bharatiya Janata Party (BJP) politician in Rajasthan, India, and former Speaker of Rajasthan Legislative Assembly from 24 July 1998 to 4 January 1999.

He was five times MLA from Rajgarh in the Alwar district.
He belongs to Village thekreen Rajgarh. He died in May 2014.

References 

 

Rajasthani politicians
Bharatiya Janata Party politicians from Rajasthan
Speakers of the Rajasthan Legislative Assembly
People from Alwar
Year of birth missing
2014 deaths
Deputy Speakers of the Rajasthan Legislative Assembly